Thomas Vasov (born 31 January 1972) is a Serbian-German football manager and former player. He is currently coaching Timok.

Club career
Born in Trier, West Germany, he was already playing in Serbia with FK Timok before his transfer to FK Borac Čačak in 1993. In his first season with Borac, they became champions of the 1993–94 Second League of FR Yugoslavia and got promotion to the First League of FR Yugoslavia where he played the following two seasons making 54 appearances and scoring 3 goals in the Yugoslav top-tier.

After 3 years with Borac, in summer 1996 he transferred to Belgium to K.A.A. Gent and played with them the following 7 seasons in the Belgian Pro League.

In 2003, he transferred to Shanghai Shenhua and won the Chinese Jia-A League 2003. However, Shanghai Shenhua were stripped of the title on 19 February 2013 for the match-fixing scandal in that season.

Coaching career
By Autumn 2014 he was working as coach of the youth team of FK Borac Čačak.

In April 2016, after Ljubiša Stamenković got sacked, Vasov took charge as main coach of FK Borac Čačak.

By January 2017, he was the director of all youth sections of FK Mladost Lučani.

In the 2019–20 season, and, at the start of the 2020–21 season, he was coach of FK Trepča.

Honours
Borac Čačak
Second League of FR Yugoslavia: 1993–94

Shanghai Shenhua
Chinese Jia-A League: 2003

References

External links
 Tomas Vasov at soccerbase.com

1972 births
Living people
Sportspeople from Trier
German footballers
Serbian footballers
Association football defenders
FK Timok players
FK Borac Čačak players
Expatriate footballers in Serbia and Montenegro
K.A.A. Gent players
Belgian Pro League players
Expatriate footballers in Belgium
Shanghai Shenhua F.C. players
Expatriate footballers in China
German football managers
Serbian football managers
FK Borac Čačak managers
Footballers from Rhineland-Palatinate